Umm Qasr Sport Club is an Iraqi football team based in Umm Qasr, Basra, that plays in Iraq Division Two.

Managerial history

  Safaa Aassi

See also 
 2000–01 Iraqi Elite League
 2021–22 Iraq Division Two

References

External links
 Iraq Clubs- Foundation Dates
 Basra Clubs Union

Football clubs in Iraq
1992 establishments in Iraq
Association football clubs established in 1992
Football clubs in Basra
Basra